Teachers' Day is a special day for the appreciation of teachers, and may include celebrations to honor them for their special contributions in a particular field area, or the community tone in education. This is the primary reason why countries celebrate this day on different dates, unlike many other International Days. For example, Argentina has commemorated Domingo Faustino Sarmiento's death on 11 September as Teachers' Day since 1915. In India the birthday of the second president Sarvepalli Radhakrishnan, 5 September, is celebrated as Teachers' Day since 1962, while Guru Purnima has been traditionally observed as a day to worship teachers/gurus by Hindus. Many countries celebrate their Teachers' Day on 5 October in conjunction with World Teachers' Day, which was established by UNESCO in 1994.

Dates by country/region 

A day for homeschool teacher appreciation has been suggested, which several homeschooling groups subsequently organized. A United States "parents as teachers day" has existed on 8 November since the 1970s. While this initially focussed on the role of parents in early-childhood learning, some homeschoolers use it to acknowledge the primacy of the parental role in education.

See also 
International Day of Education
Teacher's Oath
World Teachers' Day – established by UNESCO

References

External links 
 

Teaching
Unofficial observances
Lists of observances
Holidays and observances by scheduling (nth weekday of the month)
Sunday observances
Friday observances